Oliver James "O. J." Seraphin (or Seraphine; born August 2, 1943) is a former Dominican politician. He served as the Minister of communication and works and housing for the Labour Party government from 1975–1979 and  acting Prime Minister of Dominica from 25 June 1979 until 21 July 1980.

Early life
Seraphin grew up in Roseau, Dominica, the capital, and received primary and secondary education at Roseau Mixed School and Dominica Grammar School; later in life, he studied at the Carnegie Institute in the United States and in Cuba. Prior to politics, he worked in the insurance industry.

Government Minister
He served in the socialist Dominica Labour Party government of Prime Minister Patrick John from 1975 to 1979. Seraphin originally held the posts of Minister of Communications, Works, and Housing, but in a cabinet reshuffle, the Prime Minister made him Minister of Agriculture, Lands, Fisheries and Caricom Affairs. During this time, the Commonwealth of Dominica gained its independence from the United Kingdom. When violent crowds opposed to the John government protested outside the House of Assembly, Seraphin resigned.

Prime Minister
Seraphin became Prime Minister on June 25, 1979, at the request of the Committee of National Salvation. In August 1979, Dominica was hit by Hurricane David, which killed over 76 people, and devastated much of the island.  Seraphin was preoccupied with rescue and rebuilding efforts. He traveled to Barbados, Canada, France, the United States, and Venezuela to seek financial aid for rebuilding his country's infrastructure, in which he did. He was known to also help and rebuild homes for the homeless financing it all from his own personal account. He restored the island and helped create jobs. In his one plus year in office, he is said to have helped over half of the population of the island in the biggest hurricane Dominica has faced.

He lost the 1980 general election to Eugenia Charles.

Life after politics
Seraphin's government is commonly referred to as the "Interim Government." Since leaving politics, he has returned to business, especially that which is tourism-related, and maintains a public profile.

He is married to Lily Seraphin.

References

1943 births
Living people
People from Roseau
Dominica Labour Party politicians
Prime Ministers of Dominica
Agriculture ministers of Dominica
Communication ministers of Dominica
Foreign ministers of Dominica
Fisheries ministers of Dominica
Housing ministers of Dominica
Public works ministers of Dominica
Members of the House of Assembly of Dominica
Dominica businesspeople
20th-century Dominica politicians